Anjo Mau may refer to:

 Anjo Mau (1976 TV series), a Brazilian telenovela
 Anjo Mau (1997 TV series), based on the 1976 TV series